The French Women's National Baseball team represents the French Federation of Baseball and Softball in international competitions, such as the Women's World Cup the Women's European Baseball Championship.  They are currently ranked 16th in the world. The team are current European champions, having successfully defended their title in 2022.

References

External links 
 France Baseball-Softball Federation official Website

National baseball teams in Europe
National sports teams of France
Baseball in France